Arguello is a Spanish surname. Notable people with the surname include:

Christine Arguello (born 1955), United States district judge of the United States District Court for the District of Colorado and former Colorado state official
Irma Arguello (born ?), Argentine international security expert
Marcella Arguello (born 1985), American comedian
Ricardo Arguello (? – ?), Mexican sprinter

Spanish-language surnames